Jeff Johnson (born 1956) is a recording artist, composer and producer who has released numerous solo and collaborative recordings. Born near Portland, Oregon, he currently resides in the San Juan Islands in the state of Washington

His early work was vocal progressive-rock, but his sound has since evolved to jazz, new-age, instrumental, contemplative and Celtic styles. He has collaborated with other established musicians, including Sandy Simpson, Brian Dunning, and Phil Keaggy. His works also include several musical releases based on books penned by fantasy author Stephen Lawhead.

In addition to recording, Johnson is active in the ongoing Selah Service music and contemplative worship events, featuring music, readings from the Psalms and silent prayer.

Vocal Recordings
Johnson's early vocal recordings were stylistically progressive rock. The lyrics were inspired by a diverse group of authors, artists and historical figures including C. S. Lewis, Charles Williams, George MacDonald, Blaise Pascal, Francis Schaeffer, Tom Stoppard, William Shakespeare, Auguste Rodin, Paul Gauguin, Pierre-Auguste Renoir and Ludwig II of Bavaria.

His first recording efforts, The Anvil Of God's Word and Please Forgive Us, Lord were recorded in 1976, when he was a "young teenager" [1] and were never officially released on CD. After many years, they were made available on a CD entitled Early Songs as part of the ArkMusic Special Editions series.[2]

His first studio album, Face of the Deep (1980), managed to conjure aural landscapes in the ears of his listeners with his synthesizer infused progressive rock renditions of fantasy works. The album begins with the pensive image of Rodin's The Thinker. Songs are inspired by writings such as Charles Williams' All Hallows' Eve, and by the paintings of Gauguin and Renoir's The Moulin de la Galette. Johnson completes his treatment of these aural landscapes with on-location recordings of atmospheric sounds such as rain storms and creaking gates - incorporating them into the music in an artful way.

On his second album, he collaborated with Sandy Simpson to record Through the Door (1982), which took up the theme of spiritual quest inspired by the novels of George MacDonald (The Golden Key). It also continued the use of synthesizers in the slightly sci-fi themed song, The Jupiter Effect. It was also on this album that Johnson first recorded his personal 'theme' - 'Someday someday' — a song he would record in several versions throughout his discography.

Johnson continued the theme of the spiritual quest on albums such as: Fallen Splendour and Pilgrimage. Incorporating influences from several of the Inklings, including a song inspired by C.S. Lewis — Dream of the Island (Similitudes).

His more recent vocal works are more liturgically inspired. Lyrics include passages from the Biblical Psalms as well as prayers by early Irish saints Columba and Patrick as well as Teresa of Ávila and Francis of Assisi.

Instrumental Recordings
Johnson's instrumental releases cover a broad spectrum of Celtic, New Age, Jazz and World Music genres.

His collaborations with Irish flutist, Brian Dunning, include music inspired by the stories of Stephen R. Lawhead as well as a series of Celtic Christmas releases which were licensed by Windham Hill for that label's Winter Solstice and Celtic Christmas compilations.

He also collaborated on several releases with Portland, Oregon bassist, David Friesen and additional releases with world-renowned guitarist, Phil Keaggy.

In 2018, he released Eirlandia, an instrumental release of Modern Irish music. The album was inspired by the Stephen R. Lawhead novel of the same name.

In 2019, he will be releasing  a third collaborative work with Phil Keaggy, a collection called Cappadocia, inspired by Johnson's recent visits to Turkey.

Breadth of work and collaborations
Johnson is a versatile musician, using sounds ranging from soaring synthesizers to acoustic Oregon double-bass and contemporary piano solos. Johnson has collaborated in a number of distinct projects over the course of his career, including: Instrumental fantasy, Celtic and sci-fi inspired works.

Through his career, Johnson has collaborated with a diverse range of artists and musicians. In 1991, he played with Derri Daugherty (The Choir); jazz players David Friesen and Dave Hagelganz; and rock drummer Mark Schulman.

Classical singer and soprano Janet Chvatal performs Latin chant on the album 'Psalmus' and atmospheric vocals on several instrumental albums.

In 2002, he contributed an original tune with Brian Dunning on the Gangs of New York (soundtrack), alongside artists such as Peter Gabriel.

His work with flutist Brian Dunning first began on the 1991 album Great Romantics and continued through several albums, including the 2018 release "Eirlandia."  The Smooth Jazz Ride calls the collaboration on Erilandia, "a great reunion of musical minds bent on excellence." |The Smooth Jazz Ride

In 2009, he contributed the track "Heaven's Door" for Eckhart Tolle's Music to Quiet the Mind.

More recently, he appeared with Phil Keaggy on the instrumental albums Frio Suite (2009), and Water Sky (2012) - chosen for the 25 Essential Echoes CDs: The Best of 2012. A third collaboration with Keaggy is scheduled for Spring 2019.

Johnson's recordings have been licensed and featured on numerous commercials, compilations, spoken word and movie soundtracks including the Martin Scorsese film, "Gangs of New York," Ruth Bell Graham’s "A Quiet Knowing," the Hearts of Space "Celtic Twilight" and Windham Hill "Winter Solstice" and "Celtic Christmas" series, Eckhart Tolle’s "Music to Quiet the Mind," Angela Elwell Hunt’s "The Tale of Three Trees," Keith Patman's "Centerpoint: Poetry & Music for Christmas and Scott Cairn’s "Parable"

Johnson produced an album of original music for Mercedes Benz, titled Rhythms of the Road. The company included a CD with every new car sold. In an interview with The High Calling, Johnson said he was contacted by a car owner who totaled her Mercedes, with the CD stuck in the player. 'She was more upset about losing her CD than losing her car,' he said. Johnson sent her another copy."

Ark Records
Ark Records publishes both Jeff Johnson's catalogue of albums, and those of a few musical associates.

Jeff Johnson produced music since his early teens, and started Ark Records in "a small studio in our house with a friend back in 1977" (Tigard, Oregon).  Learning the recording process in a pre-PC age helped him hone his skills. "Back then, it was all tape-based and the curve was high in learning how to record, edit and mix music."   Since then, Ark Records has produced and distributed more than 50 albums, and gained international recognition and distribution.

Around 1998, Johnson moved Ark Records to the San Juan Islands in Washington State.

Discography (partial)

See also
 C.S. Lewis
 George MacDonald
 List of ambient music artists
 New-age music
 Owen Barfield
 Progressive rock
 Stephen Lawhead
 Janet Chvatal

References

External links
 Ark Records Website
 Selah Service Website
 Creativity for the Rest of Us, Interview
 Interview with Jeff Johnson and Phil Keaggy
 Interview with musician Jeff Johnson, Celtic Voices
 Find a Little Wonder, Interview with Jeff Johnson, Red Letter Believers

1956 births
Living people
Musicians from Washington (state)